Ass Backwards is a 2013 American female buddy black comedy film written by and starring June Diane Raphael and Casey Wilson. The film is directed by Chris Nelson and produced by Heather Rae.

The film premiered at the Sundance Film Festival on January 21, 2013. The film was made available on iTunes and VOD on September 30, 2013, leading up to the film's theatrical release on November 8, 2013.

Plot
Loveable losers Kate and Chloe (June Diane Raphael and Casey Wilson) are best friends with a not-so-firm grip on reality. The girls have been inseparable ever since tying for dead last at a kiddie beauty pageant as children. Now they are all grown up and living in New York City, where Chloe is a "rising star" dancing in a glass box at a nightclub and Kate is the "CEO" of her own one-woman egg-donor "corporation".

Their past humiliations at the pageant remain long forgotten until they receive an invitation to the pageant's milestone anniversary celebration. With the unpleasant memories flooding back, Kate and Chloe decide to redeem themselves and take a road trip back to their hometown and win the elusive crown.

On the road, they face some hard truths about themselves and each other as they encounter drug addicts, spring breakers, strip club hooligans, a feminist farming collective, and their favorite reality TV star, leading to the girls' homecoming and final reckoning with their past, present and future.

Cast
June Diane Raphael as Kate Fenner
Casey Wilson as Chloe West
Alicia Silverstone as Laurel Kelly
Jon Cryer as Dean Morris
Vincent D'Onofrio as Bruce West
Brian Geraghty as Brian Hickman
Bob Odenkirk as Pageant Emcee
Paul Scheer as Strip Club Owner
Sandy Martin as Qwen
Marcia Jean Kurtz as Barb
Lea DeLaria as Deb
Paul Rust as Seth
Drew Droege as Homeless Norma
Debra Monk as Pawn Shop Owner

Release
The film premiered at the 2013 Sundance Film Festival in Park City, Utah, on January 21, 2013. It made its Los Angeles premiere at the Outfest Film Festival on July 13, 2013.

Since its Sundance premiere, the film was acquired by Gravitas Ventures, who announced its VOD release for September 30, 2013 before its theatrical release on November 8, 2013.

Home media
Ass Backwards was released on DVD on January 28, 2014.

Reception
The film has received mostly negative reactions from critics. The A.V. Club, Hollywood.com, FirstShowing.net, RogerEbert.com, and CraveOnline gave favorable reviews, but the film was panned by Variety and the Los Angeles Times. At Metacritic, which assigns a normalized rating out of 100 to reviews from mainstream critics, the film has received an average score of 37, based on 10 reviews. Film review aggregator Rotten Tomatoes reports that 27% of critics gave the film a positive review based on 22 reviews, with an average score of 4.27/10. The website's critics consensus reads: "June Diane Raphael and Casey Wilson are sharp comedic performers, but their co-written script gives them little to work with in this meandering farce."

Robert Abele of the Los Angeles Times stated: 

One of the harsher reviews came from Dennis Harvey of Variety who called the film "a comedy built on the amusement value of stupid people that is itself too stupid to be funny".

On the other hand, Chris Packham of The Village Voice wrote: 

A more positive reaction to the film came from RogerEbert.com critic Christy Lemire: 

The A.V. Club gave the film a B rating: "Ass Backwards overcomes the obvious beats with clever, occasionally dark jokes that reveal the sharpness of its stars' writing."

Ethan Anderton of FirstShowing.net said: 

Hollywood.com had one of the more favorable reviews:

Filming
Shot in various Upstate New York locations (including Albany, Tarrytown and Saratoga Springs) in summer 2010, production was initially halted due to an investor defaulting. In 2011, writers-stars Raphael and Wilson launched a successful Kickstarter campaign to raise money to finish the film, as well as executive producer Dori Sperko also helping finance the remaining days of shooting in New York City in summer 2012 to complete the film.

References

External links
 

2013 films
2013 black comedy films
2013 independent films
2010s comedy road movies
2010s screwball comedy films
American black comedy films
American female buddy films
American independent films
American comedy road movies
American screwball comedy films
Films about beauty pageants
2010s English-language films
Films set in Manhattan
Films shot in New York (state)
Kickstarter-funded films
Lesbian-related films
American slapstick comedy films
Worldview Entertainment films
2010s female buddy films
2010s American films